Suzanna Nannette Sablairolles (13 January 1829, Middelburg – 13 January 1867, Amsterdam) was a Dutch stage actress.

Life
She was born to actor Jacob Henry Sablairolles (1793–1833) and costume dresser Johanna Scholten (1793–1842).  

She was active at the Zuid-Hollandsche Tooneelisten in The Hague in 1839-1853, at the Amsterdamse Schouwburg 1853-1857 and 1859–1867, and at the Rotterdamse Schouwburg in 1857-1859.

Suzanna Sablairolles was known for her roles as the heroine of romantic tragedies. She had a long term love relationship with her colleague Pierre Auguste Morin from 1851; the couple often played onstage lovers, which was much appreciated by the public. She had four children with Morin, but they did not marry. She was very popular and referred to as "The jewel of the theatre company" and the darling of the public. 

She died in childbirth in the middle of a successful tour and her death was much reported in the media.

References 

1829 births
1867 deaths
Dutch stage actresses
19th-century Dutch actresses
Deaths in childbirth
People from Middelburg, Zeeland